Earl "Buck" Evans (April 14, 1900 – December 5, 1991) was a professional American football player who played offensive lineman for five seasons for the Chicago Cardinals and the Chicago Bears.

1900 births
1991 deaths
People from Lucas County, Iowa
Players of American football from Iowa
American football offensive guards
American football offensive tackles
Chicago Cardinals players
Chicago Bears players
Harvard Crimson football players
Marquette Golden Avalanche football players